The Lepidoptera of Switzerland consist of both the butterflies and moths recorded from Switzerland.

Butterflies

Hesperiidae
Carcharodus alceae 
Carcharodus baeticus 
Carcharodus floccifera 
Carcharodus lavatherae 
Carterocephalus palaemon 
Erynnis tages 
Hesperia comma 
Heteropterus morpheus 
Ochlodes sylvanus 
Pyrgus accretus 
Pyrgus alveus 
Pyrgus andromedae 
Pyrgus armoricanus 
Pyrgus cacaliae 
Pyrgus carlinae 
Pyrgus carthami 
Pyrgus cirsii 
Pyrgus malvae 
Pyrgus malvoides 
Pyrgus onopordi 
Pyrgus serratulae 
Pyrgus warrenensis 
Spialia sertorius 
Thymelicus acteon 
Thymelicus lineola 
Thymelicus sylvestris

Lycaenidae
Agriades glandon 
Agriades orbitulus 
Agriades optilete 
Aricia agestis 
Aricia artaxerxes 
Aricia nicias 
Cacyreus marshalli 
Callophrys rubi 
Celastrina argiolus 
Cupido minimus 
Cupido osiris 
Cupido alcetas 
Cupido argiades 
Cyaniris semiargus 
Eumedonia eumedon 
Favonius quercus 
Glaucopsyche alexis 
Iolana iolas 
Kretania trappi 
Lampides boeticus 
Leptotes pirithous 
Lycaena alciphron 
Lycaena dispar 
Lycaena helle 
Lycaena hippothoe 
Lycaena phlaeas 
Lycaena subalpina 
Lycaena tityrus 
Lycaena virgaureae 
Lysandra bellargus 
Lysandra coridon 
Phengaris alcon 
Phengaris arion 
Phengaris nausithous 
Phengaris teleius 
Plebejus argus 
Plebejus argyrognomon 
Plebejus idas 
Polyommatus damon 
Polyommatus daphnis 
Polyommatus amandus 
Polyommatus dorylas 
Polyommatus eros 
Polyommatus escheri 
Polyommatus icarus 
Polyommatus thersites 
Pseudophilotes baton 
Satyrium acaciae 
Satyrium ilicis 
Satyrium pruni 
Satyrium spini 
Satyrium w-album 
Scolitantides orion 
Thecla betulae

Nymphalidae
Aglais io 
Aglais urticae 
Apatura ilia 
Apatura iris 
Aphantopus hyperantus 
Araschnia levana 
Argynnis pandora 
Argynnis paphia 
Boloria aquilonaris 
Boloria napaea 
Boloria pales 
Boloria dia 
Boloria euphrosyne 
Boloria selene 
Boloria thore 
Boloria titania 
Brenthis daphne 
Brenthis ino 
Brintesia circe 
Chazara briseis 
Coenonympha arcania 
Coenonympha darwiniana 
Coenonympha gardetta 
Coenonympha glycerion 
Coenonympha hero 
Coenonympha oedippus 
Coenonympha pamphilus 
Coenonympha tullia 
Erebia aethiops 
Erebia alberganus 
Erebia bubastis 
Erebia cassioides 
Erebia christi 
Erebia epiphron 
Erebia eriphyle 
Erebia euryale 
Erebia flavofasciata 
Erebia gorge 
Erebia ligea 
Erebia manto 
Erebia medusa 
Erebia melampus 
Erebia meolans 
Erebia mnestra 
Erebia montanus 
Erebia nivalis 
Erebia oeme 
Erebia pandrose 
Erebia pharte 
Erebia pluto 
Erebia pronoe 
Erebia psathura 
Erebia styx 
Erebia sudetica 
Erebia triarius 
Erebia tyndarus 
Euphydryas aurinia 
Euphydryas cynthia 
Euphydryas intermedia 
Fabriciana adippe 
Fabriciana niobe 
Hipparchia fagi 
Hipparchia genava 
Hipparchia hermione 
Hipparchia statilinus 
Hipparchia semele 
Hyponephele lycaon 
Issoria lathonia 
Lasiommata maera 
Lasiommata megera 
Lasiommata petropolitana 
Libythea celtis 
Limenitis camilla 
Limenitis populi 
Limenitis reducta 
Lopinga achine 
Maniola jurtina 
Melanargia galathea 
Melitaea asteria 
Melitaea athalia 
Melitaea aurelia 
Melitaea britomartis 
Melitaea cinxia 
Melitaea deione 
Melitaea diamina 
Melitaea didyma 
Melitaea nevadensis 
Melitaea parthenoides 
Melitaea phoebe 
Melitaea varia 
Minois dryas 
Neptis rivularis 
Nymphalis antiopa 
Nymphalis polychloros 
Oeneis glacialis 
Pararge aegeria 
Polygonia c-album 
Polygonia egea 
Pyronia cecilia 
Pyronia tithonus 
Satyrus ferula 
Speyeria aglaja 
Vanessa atalanta 
Vanessa cardui

Papilionidae
Iphiclides podalirius 
Papilio alexanor 
Papilio machaon 
Parnassius apollo 
Parnassius mnemosyne 
Parnassius phoebus 
Zerynthia polyxena

Pieridae
Anthocharis cardamines 
Anthocharis euphenoides 
Aporia crataegi 
Colias alfacariensis 
Colias croceus 
Colias hyale 
Colias palaeno 
Colias phicomone 
Euchloe simplonia 
Gonepteryx rhamni 
Gonepteryx cleopatra 
Leptidea reali 
Leptidea sinapis 
Pieris brassicae 
Pieris bryoniae 
Pieris mannii 
Pieris napi 
Pieris rapae 
Pontia callidice 
Pontia edusa

Riodinidae
Hamearis lucina

Moths

Adelidae
Adela albicinctella 
Adela australis 
Adela croesella 
Adela cuprella 
Adela reaumurella 
Adela violella 
Cauchas fibulella 
Cauchas rufimitrella 
Nematopogon adansoniella 
Nematopogon magna 
Nematopogon metaxella 
Nematopogon pilella 
Nematopogon robertella 
Nematopogon schwarziellus 
Nematopogon swammerdamella 
Nemophora associatella 
Nemophora congruella 
Nemophora cupriacella 
Nemophora degeerella 
Nemophora dumerilella 
Nemophora metallica 
Nemophora ochsenheimerella 
Nemophora prodigellus 
Nemophora raddaella 
Nemophora violellus

Alucitidae
Alucita desmodactyla 
Alucita grammodactyla 
Alucita hexadactyla 
Alucita huebneri

Argyresthiidae
Argyresthia abdominalis 
Argyresthia albistria 
Argyresthia aurulentella 
Argyresthia bonnetella 
Argyresthia brockeella 
Argyresthia conjugella 
Argyresthia curvella 
Argyresthia fundella 
Argyresthia glaucinella 
Argyresthia goedartella 
Argyresthia huguenini 
Argyresthia ivella 
Argyresthia marmorata 
Argyresthia pruniella 
Argyresthia pulchella 
Argyresthia pygmaeella 
Argyresthia retinella 
Argyresthia semifusca 
Argyresthia semitestacella 
Argyresthia sorbiella 
Argyresthia spinosella 
Argyresthia submontana 
Argyresthia amiantella 
Argyresthia arceuthina 
Argyresthia bergiella 
Argyresthia dilectella 
Argyresthia glabratella 
Argyresthia illuminatella 
Argyresthia laevigatella 
Argyresthia praecocella 
Argyresthia reticulata 
Argyresthia thuiella 
Argyresthia trifasciata

Autostichidae
Holcopogon bubulcellus 
Oegoconia caradjai 
Oegoconia deauratella 
Oegoconia huemeri 
Oegoconia uralskella 
Symmoca signatella 
Symmoca signella

Batrachedridae
Batrachedra pinicolella 
Batrachedra praeangusta

Bedelliidae
Bedellia somnulentella

Blastobasidae
Blastobasis phycidella 
Hypatopa binotella 
Hypatopa inunctella

Brahmaeidae
Lemonia dumi 
Lemonia taraxaci

Bucculatricidae
Bucculatrix absinthii 
Bucculatrix albedinella 
Bucculatrix alpina 
Bucculatrix artemisiella 
Bucculatrix bechsteinella 
Bucculatrix cidarella 
Bucculatrix clavenae 
Bucculatrix cristatella 
Bucculatrix demaryella 
Bucculatrix fatigatella 
Bucculatrix frangutella 
Bucculatrix nigricomella 
Bucculatrix thoracella 
Bucculatrix ulmella

Chimabachidae
Dasystoma salicella 
Diurnea fagella 
Diurnea lipsiella

Choreutidae
Anthophila fabriciana 
Choreutis diana 
Choreutis nemorana 
Choreutis pariana 
Prochoreutis holotoxa 
Prochoreutis myllerana 
Prochoreutis sehestediana 
Tebenna bjerkandrella

Coleophoridae
Augasma aeratella 
Coleophora absinthii 
Coleophora adelogrammella 
Coleophora ahenella 
Coleophora albella 
Coleophora albicans 
Coleophora albicostella 
Coleophora albidella 
Coleophora albitarsella 
Coleophora albulae 
Coleophora alcyonipennella 
Coleophora alnifoliae 
Coleophora alticolella 
Coleophora anatipenella 
Coleophora antennariella 
Coleophora argentula 
Coleophora artemisicolella 
Coleophora asteris 
Coleophora astragalella 
Coleophora auricella 
Coleophora badiipennella 
Coleophora betulella 
Coleophora bilineatella 
Coleophora binderella 
Coleophora breviuscula 
Coleophora burmanni 
Coleophora caelebipennella 
Coleophora caespititiella 
Coleophora chamaedriella 
Coleophora colutella 
Coleophora conspicuella 
Coleophora conyzae 
Coleophora coracipennella 
Coleophora cornutella 
Coleophora coronillae 
Coleophora currucipennella 
Coleophora deauratella 
Coleophora directella 
Coleophora discordella 
Coleophora ditella 
Coleophora flavipennella 
Coleophora follicularis 
Coleophora frischella 
Coleophora fuscocuprella 
Coleophora galbulipennella 
Coleophora gallipennella 
Coleophora glaucicolella 
Coleophora glitzella 
Coleophora graminicolella 
Coleophora gryphipennella 
Coleophora hemerobiella 
Coleophora ibipennella 
Coleophora idaeella 
Coleophora juncicolella 
Coleophora kuehnella 
Coleophora laricella 
Coleophora limosipennella 
Coleophora lineolea 
Coleophora linosyridella 
Coleophora lithargyrinella 
Coleophora lixella 
Coleophora lusciniaepennella 
Coleophora lutipennella 
Coleophora mayrella 
Coleophora millefolii 
Coleophora milvipennis 
Coleophora niveicostella 
Coleophora niveistrigella 
Coleophora nubivagella 
Coleophora nutantella 
Coleophora ochrea 
Coleophora ochripennella 
Coleophora onobrychiella 
Coleophora orbitella 
Coleophora oriolella 
Coleophora ornatipennella 
Coleophora otidipennella 
Coleophora pappiferella 
Coleophora paripennella 
Coleophora pennella 
Coleophora pratella 
Coleophora prunifoliae 
Coleophora pyrrhulipennella 
Coleophora ramosella 
Coleophora rectilineella 
Coleophora riffelensis 
Coleophora saponariella 
Coleophora serpylletorum 
Coleophora serratella 
Coleophora serratulella 
Coleophora settarii 
Coleophora siccifolia 
Coleophora silenella 
Coleophora solenella 
Coleophora spinella 
Coleophora spumosella 
Coleophora squamosella 
Coleophora sternipennella 
Coleophora striatipennella 
Coleophora succursella 
Coleophora sylvaticella 
Coleophora taeniipennella 
Coleophora therinella 
Coleophora tractella 
Coleophora trifariella 
Coleophora trifolii 
Coleophora trigeminella 
Coleophora trochilella 
Coleophora vacciniella 
Coleophora valesianella 
Coleophora versurella 
Coleophora vestianella 
Coleophora vibicella 
Coleophora violacea 
Coleophora virgatella 
Coleophora vitisella 
Coleophora vulnerariae 
Coleophora wockeella 
Metriotes lutarea

Cosmopterigidae
Ascalenia vanella 
Cosmopterix lienigiella 
Cosmopterix orichalcea 
Cosmopterix pulchrimella 
Cosmopterix schmidiella 
Cosmopterix scribaiella 
Cosmopterix zieglerella 
Eteobalea albiapicella 
Eteobalea anonymella 
Eteobalea serratella 
Isidiella nickerlii 
Limnaecia phragmitella 
Pancalia leuwenhoekella 
Pancalia schwarzella 
Pyroderces argyrogrammos 
Sorhagenia janiszewskae 
Sorhagenia lophyrella 
Sorhagenia rhamniella 
Stagmatophora heydeniella 
Vulcaniella pomposella

Cossidae
Acossus terebra 
Cossus cossus 
Dyspessa ulula 
Phragmataecia castaneae 
Zeuzera pyrina

Crambidae
Acentria ephemerella 
Agriphila biarmicus 
Agriphila deliella 
Agriphila geniculea 
Agriphila inquinatella 
Agriphila selasella 
Agriphila straminella 
Agriphila tristella 
Agrotera nemoralis 
Anania coronata 
Anania crocealis 
Anania funebris 
Anania fuscalis 
Anania hortulata 
Anania lancealis 
Anania luctualis 
Anania perlucidalis 
Anania stachydalis 
Anania terrealis 
Anania verbascalis 
Ancylolomia tentaculella 
Antigastra catalaunalis 
Atralata albofascialis 
Calamotropha aureliellus 
Calamotropha paludella 
Cataclysta lemnata 
Catharia pyrenaealis 
Catharia simplonialis 
Catoptria combinella 
Catoptria conchella 
Catoptria falsella 
Catoptria furcatellus 
Catoptria languidellus 
Catoptria luctiferella 
Catoptria lythargyrella 
Catoptria maculalis 
Catoptria margaritella 
Catoptria myella 
Catoptria mytilella 
Catoptria permutatellus 
Catoptria petrificella 
Catoptria pinella 
Catoptria pyramidellus 
Catoptria speculalis 
Catoptria verellus 
Catoptria zermattensis 
Chilo phragmitella 
Chrysocrambus craterella 
Chrysocrambus linetella 
Chrysoteuchia culmella 
Crambus alienellus 
Crambus ericella 
Crambus hamella 
Crambus lathoniellus 
Crambus pascuella 
Crambus perlella 
Crambus pratella 
Crambus silvella 
Crambus uliginosellus 
Cydalima perspectalis 
Cynaeda dentalis 
Cynaeda gigantea 
Diasemia reticularis 
Diasemiopsis ramburialis 
Diplopseustis perieresalis 
Dolicharthria punctalis 
Donacaula forficella 
Donacaula mucronella 
Ecpyrrhorrhoe diffusalis 
Ecpyrrhorrhoe rubiginalis 
Elophila nymphaeata 
Euchromius ocellea 
Eudonia delunella 
Eudonia lacustrata 
Eudonia laetella 
Eudonia mercurella 
Eudonia murana 
Eudonia pallida 
Eudonia petrophila 
Eudonia phaeoleuca 
Eudonia sudetica 
Eudonia truncicolella 
Eudonia vallesialis 
Eurrhypis pollinalis 
Evergestis aenealis 
Evergestis extimalis 
Evergestis forficalis 
Evergestis limbata 
Evergestis pallidata 
Evergestis politalis 
Evergestis sophialis 
Friedlanderia cicatricella 
Gesneria centuriella 
Heliothela wulfeniana 
Hellula undalis 
Hodebertia testalis 
Hydriris ornatalis 
Loxostege manualis 
Loxostege sticticalis 
Loxostege virescalis 
Mecyna asinalis 
Mecyna flavalis 
Mecyna lutealis 
Metasia ophialis 
Metaxmeste phrygialis 
Metaxmeste schrankiana 
Nascia cilialis 
Nomophila noctuella 
Nymphula nitidulata 
Orenaia alpestralis 
Orenaia andereggialis 
Orenaia helveticalis 
Orenaia lugubralis 
Ostrinia nubilalis 
Palpita vitrealis 
Paracorsia repandalis 
Parapoynx stratiotata 
Paratalanta hyalinalis 
Paratalanta pandalis 
Pediasia contaminella 
Pediasia luteella 
Pediasia pedriolellus 
Platytes alpinella 
Platytes cerussella 
Pleuroptya balteata 
Pleuroptya ruralis 
Psammotis pulveralis 
Pyrausta aerealis 
Pyrausta aurata 
Pyrausta cingulata 
Pyrausta coracinalis 
Pyrausta despicata 
Pyrausta falcatalis 
Pyrausta nigrata 
Pyrausta obfuscata 
Pyrausta ostrinalis 
Pyrausta porphyralis 
Pyrausta purpuralis 
Pyrausta sanguinalis 
Pyrausta virginalis 
Schoenobius gigantella 
Scirpophaga praelata 
Sclerocona acutella 
Scoparia ambigualis 
Scoparia ancipitella 
Scoparia basistrigalis 
Scoparia conicella 
Scoparia gallica 
Scoparia ingratella 
Scoparia italica 
Scoparia manifestella 
Scoparia pyralella 
Scoparia staudingeralis 
Scoparia subfusca 
Sitochroa palealis 
Sitochroa verticalis 
Thisanotia chrysonuchella 
Udea accolalis 
Udea alpinalis 
Udea austriacalis 
Udea cyanalis 
Udea decrepitalis 
Udea elutalis 
Udea ferrugalis 
Udea hamalis 
Udea inquinatalis 
Udea lutealis 
Udea murinalis 
Udea nebulalis 
Udea olivalis 
Udea prunalis 
Udea rhododendronalis 
Udea uliginosalis 
Uresiphita gilvata 
Xanthocrambus caducellus 
Xanthocrambus lucellus 
Xanthocrambus saxonellus

Douglasiidae
Tinagma balteolella 
Tinagma dryadis 
Tinagma ocnerostomella 
Tinagma perdicella

Drepanidae
Achlya flavicornis 
Asphalia ruficollis 
Cilix glaucata 
Cymatophorina diluta 
Drepana curvatula 
Drepana falcataria 
Falcaria lacertinaria 
Habrosyne pyritoides 
Ochropacha duplaris 
Polyploca ridens 
Sabra harpagula 
Tethea ocularis 
Tethea or 
Tetheella fluctuosa 
Thyatira batis 
Watsonalla binaria 
Watsonalla cultraria

Elachistidae
Agonopterix adspersella 
Agonopterix alpigena 
Agonopterix alstromeriana 
Agonopterix angelicella 
Agonopterix arenella 
Agonopterix assimilella 
Agonopterix astrantiae 
Agonopterix atomella 
Agonopterix capreolella 
Agonopterix carduella 
Agonopterix cervariella 
Agonopterix ciliella 
Agonopterix cnicella 
Agonopterix conterminella 
Agonopterix curvipunctosa 
Agonopterix flurii 
Agonopterix heracliana 
Agonopterix hippomarathri 
Agonopterix hypericella 
Agonopterix irrorata 
Agonopterix kaekeritziana 
Agonopterix laterella 
Agonopterix liturosa 
Agonopterix nanatella 
Agonopterix nervosa 
Agonopterix nodiflorella 
Agonopterix ocellana 
Agonopterix oinochroa 
Agonopterix pallorella 
Agonopterix parilella 
Agonopterix petasitis 
Agonopterix propinquella 
Agonopterix purpurea 
Agonopterix putridella 
Agonopterix rotundella 
Agonopterix rutana 
Agonopterix scopariella 
Agonopterix selini 
Agonopterix senecionis 
Agonopterix silerella 
Agonopterix subpropinquella 
Agonopterix umbellana 
Agonopterix yeatiana 
Anchinia cristalis 
Anchinia daphnella 
Anchinia grisescens 
Anchinia laureolella 
Blastodacna atra 
Blastodacna hellerella 
Chrysoclista linneella 
Depressaria absynthiella 
Depressaria albipunctella 
Depressaria artemisiae 
Depressaria badiella 
Depressaria beckmanni 
Depressaria bupleurella 
Depressaria chaerophylli 
Depressaria daucella 
Depressaria daucivorella 
Depressaria depressana 
Depressaria douglasella 
Depressaria emeritella 
Depressaria gallicella 
Depressaria heydenii 
Depressaria hofmanni 
Depressaria incognitella 
Depressaria leucocephala 
Depressaria libanotidella 
Depressaria olerella 
Depressaria pimpinellae 
Depressaria pulcherrimella 
Depressaria radiella 
Depressaria silesiaca 
Depressaria sordidatella 
Depressaria ululana 
Dystebenna stephensi 
Elachista adscitella 
Elachista argentella 
Elachista bedellella 
Elachista bisulcella 
Elachista chrysodesmella 
Elachista collitella 
Elachista dispilella 
Elachista dispunctella 
Elachista exigua 
Elachista festucicolella 
Elachista galactitella 
Elachista gangabella 
Elachista heinemanni 
Elachista klimeschiella 
Elachista metella 
Elachista nitidulella 
Elachista nolckeni 
Elachista obliquella 
Elachista parvula 
Elachista pollinariella 
Elachista pollutella 
Elachista pullicomella 
Elachista rudectella 
Elachista squamosella 
Elachista subalbidella 
Elachista subocellea 
Elachista svenssoni 
Elachista triseriatella 
Elachista albidella 
Elachista albifrontella 
Elachista alpinella 
Elachista anserinella 
Elachista apicipunctella 
Elachista argentifasciella 
Elachista atricomella 
Elachista biatomella 
Elachista bifasciella 
Elachista canapennella 
Elachista cinereopunctella 
Elachista consortella 
Elachista differens 
Elachista dimicatella 
Elachista elegans 
Elachista exactella 
Elachista freyerella 
Elachista gleichenella 
Elachista griseella 
Elachista herrichii 
Elachista humilis 
Elachista infuscata 
Elachista juliensis 
Elachista kilmunella 
Elachista lastrella 
Elachista luticomella 
Elachista maculicerusella 
Elachista nobilella 
Elachista occidentalis 
Elachista ornithopodella 
Elachista orstadii 
Elachista pigerella 
Elachista quadripunctella 
Elachista serricornis 
Elachista stabilella 
Elachista subnigrella 
Elachista tengstromi 
Elachista tetragonella 
Elachista trapeziella 
Elachista utonella 
Elachista zernyi 
Ethmia aurifluella 
Ethmia bipunctella 
Ethmia candidella 
Ethmia chrysopygella 
Ethmia dodecea 
Ethmia pusiella 
Ethmia quadrillella 
Ethmia terminella 
Exaeretia ciniflonella 
Exaeretia allisella 
Hypercallia citrinalis 
Levipalpus hepatariella 
Luquetia lobella 
Orophia denisella 
Orophia ferrugella 
Orophia sordidella 
Perittia farinella 
Perittia herrichiella 
Perittia obscurepunctella 
Perittia weberella 
Semioscopis avellanella 
Semioscopis oculella 
Semioscopis steinkellneriana 
Semioscopis strigulana 
Spuleria flavicaput 
Stephensia brunnichella 
Telechrysis tripuncta

Endromidae
Endromis versicolora

Epermeniidae
Epermenia aequidentellus 
Epermenia chaerophyllella 
Epermenia illigerella 
Epermenia insecurella 
Epermenia strictellus 
Epermenia devotella 
Epermenia iniquellus 
Epermenia profugella 
Epermenia ochreomaculellus 
Epermenia pontificella 
Epermenia scurella 
Ochromolopis ictella 
Ochromolopis staintonellus 
Phaulernis dentella 
Phaulernis fulviguttella 
Phaulernis rebeliella 
Phaulernis statariella

Erebidae
Amata kruegeri 
Amata phegea 
Apopestes spectrum 
Arctia caja 
Arctia flavia 
Arctia villica 
Arctornis l-nigrum 
Atolmis rubricollis 
Autophila dilucida 
Autophila hirsuta 
Callimorpha dominula 
Calliteara pudibunda 
Calyptra thalictri 
Catephia alchymista 
Catocala conversa 
Catocala dilecta 
Catocala electa 
Catocala elocata 
Catocala fraxini 
Catocala fulminea 
Catocala nupta 
Catocala nymphaea 
Catocala nymphagoga 
Catocala promissa 
Catocala puerpera 
Catocala sponsa 
Chelis maculosa 
Chelis simplonica 
Colobochyla salicalis 
Coscinia cribraria 
Coscinia striata 
Cybosia mesomella 
Cymbalophora pudica 
Diacrisia sannio 
Diaphora luctuosa 
Diaphora mendica 
Diaphora sordida 
Dicallomera fascelina 
Dysauxes ancilla 
Dysauxes famula 
Dysauxes punctata 
Dysgonia algira 
Eilema caniola 
Eilema complana 
Eilema depressa 
Eilema griseola 
Eilema lurideola 
Eilema lutarella 
Eilema palliatella 
Eilema pseudocomplana 
Eilema pygmaeola 
Eilema sororcula 
Eublemma minutata 
Eublemma ostrina 
Eublemma parva 
Eublemma polygramma 
Eublemma purpurina 
Euclidia mi 
Euclidia glyphica 
Euplagia quadripunctaria 
Euproctis chrysorrhoea 
Euproctis similis 
Grammia quenseli 
Grammodes stolida 
Herminia grisealis 
Herminia tarsicrinalis 
Herminia tarsipennalis 
Herminia tenuialis 
Holoarctia cervini 
Hypena crassalis 
Hypena obesalis 
Hypena obsitalis 
Hypena proboscidalis 
Hypena rostralis 
Hypenodes humidalis 
Hyphantria cunea 
Hyphoraia aulica 
Hyphoraia testudinaria 
Idia calvaria 
Laspeyria flexula 
Leucoma salicis 
Lithosia quadra 
Lygephila craccae 
Lygephila lusoria 
Lygephila pastinum 
Lygephila procax 
Lygephila viciae 
Lymantria dispar 
Lymantria monacha 
Macrochilo cribrumalis 
Metachrostis dardouini 
Miltochrista miniata 
Minucia lunaris 
Nudaria mundana 
Ocneria rubea 
Ocnogyna parasita 
Ophiusa tirhaca 
Orgyia recens 
Orgyia antiqua 
Paidia rica 
Paracolax tristalis 
Parascotia fuliginaria 
Parasemia plantaginis 
Pechipogo plumigeralis 
Pechipogo strigilata 
Pelosia muscerda 
Pelosia obtusa 
Pericallia matronula 
Phragmatobia fuliginosa 
Phragmatobia luctifera 
Phytometra viridaria 
Polypogon gryphalis 
Polypogon tentacularia 
Rhyparia purpurata 
Rivula sericealis 
Schrankia costaestrigalis 
Schrankia taenialis 
Scoliopteryx libatrix 
Setema cereola 
Setina alpestris 
Setina aurita 
Setina irrorella 
Setina roscida 
Simplicia rectalis 
Spilosoma lubricipeda 
Spilosoma lutea 
Spilosoma urticae 
Thumatha senex 
Trisateles emortualis 
Tyria jacobaeae 
Utetheisa pulchella 
Watsonarctia deserta 
Zanclognatha lunalis 
Zanclognatha zelleralis

Eriocraniidae
Dyseriocrania subpurpurella 
Eriocrania alpinella 
Eriocrania cicatricella 
Eriocrania sangii 
Eriocrania semipurpurella 
Eriocrania sparrmannella 
Heringocrania unimaculella 
Paracrania chrysolepidella

Euteliidae
Eutelia adulatrix

Gelechiidae
Acompsia cinerella 
Acompsia maculosella 
Acompsia minorella 
Acompsia tripunctella 
Acompsia schmidtiellus 
Agonochaetia intermedia 
Agonochaetia terrestrella 
Altenia scriptella 
Anacampsis blattariella 
Anacampsis hirsutella 
Anacampsis populella 
Anacampsis scintillella 
Anacampsis timidella 
Anacampsis trifoliella 
Anarsia lineatella 
Anarsia spartiella 
Anasphaltis renigerellus 
Apodia bifractella 
Aproaerema anthyllidella 
Argolamprotes micella 
Aristotelia decoratella 
Aristotelia decurtella 
Aristotelia ericinella 
Aristotelia heliacella 
Aristotelia subericinella 
Aroga flavicomella 
Aroga velocella 
Athrips amoenella 
Athrips mouffetella 
Athrips nigricostella 
Athrips pruinosella 
Athrips rancidella 
Brachmia blandella 
Brachmia dimidiella 
Brachmia inornatella 
Brachmia procursella 
Bryotropha affinis 
Bryotropha basaltinella 
Bryotropha boreella 
Bryotropha desertella 
Bryotropha domestica 
Bryotropha galbanella 
Bryotropha senectella 
Bryotropha similis 
Bryotropha terrella 
Carpatolechia alburnella 
Carpatolechia decorella 
Carpatolechia fugacella 
Carpatolechia fugitivella 
Carpatolechia notatella 
Carpatolechia proximella 
Caryocolum albifaciella 
Caryocolum alsinella 
Caryocolum amaurella 
Caryocolum blandella 
Caryocolum blandelloides 
Caryocolum blandulella 
Caryocolum cassella 
Caryocolum cauligenella 
Caryocolum crypticum 
Caryocolum delphinatella 
Caryocolum fischerella 
Caryocolum fraternella 
Caryocolum huebneri 
Caryocolum interalbicella 
Caryocolum junctella 
Caryocolum kroesmanniella 
Caryocolum leucomelanella 
Caryocolum leucothoracellum 
Caryocolum marmorea 
Caryocolum moehringiae 
Caryocolum mucronatella 
Caryocolum oculatella 
Caryocolum petrophila 
Caryocolum petryi 
Caryocolum proxima 
Caryocolum repentis 
Caryocolum saginella 
Caryocolum schleichi 
Caryocolum tischeriella 
Caryocolum tricolorella 
Caryocolum vicinella 
Caryocolum viscariella 
Chionodes distinctella 
Chionodes electella 
Chionodes fumatella 
Chionodes hayreddini 
Chionodes holosericella 
Chionodes luctuella 
Chionodes lugubrella 
Chionodes nebulosella 
Chionodes perpetuella 
Chionodes praeclarella 
Chionodes tragicella 
Chionodes viduella 
Chrysoesthia drurella 
Chrysoesthia eppelsheimi 
Chrysoesthia sexguttella 
Cosmardia moritzella 
Crossobela trinotella 
Dichomeris alacella 
Dichomeris derasella 
Dichomeris juniperella 
Dichomeris latipennella 
Dichomeris limosellus 
Dichomeris marginella 
Dichomeris nitiellus 
Dichomeris ustalella 
Ephysteris insulella 
Eulamprotes atrella 
Eulamprotes libertinella 
Eulamprotes plumbella 
Eulamprotes superbella 
Eulamprotes unicolorella 
Eulamprotes wilkella 
Exoteleia dodecella 
Exoteleia succinctella 
Filatima incomptella 
Filatima spurcella 
Gelechia asinella 
Gelechia basipunctella 
Gelechia cuneatella 
Gelechia hippophaella 
Gelechia muscosella 
Gelechia nigra 
Gelechia rhombella 
Gelechia sabinellus 
Gelechia scotinella 
Gelechia senticetella 
Gelechia sestertiella 
Gelechia sororculella 
Gelechia turpella 
Gladiovalva rumicivorella 
Gnorimoschema epithymella 
Gnorimoschema valesiella 
Helcystogramma arulensis 
Helcystogramma lineolella 
Helcystogramma lutatella 
Helcystogramma rufescens 
Helcystogramma triannulella 
Hypatima rhomboidella 
Isophrictis anthemidella 
Isophrictis striatella 
Istrianis myricariella 
Iwaruna biguttella 
Klimeschiopsis discontinuella 
Klimeschiopsis kiningerella 
Mesophleps silacella 
Metzneria aestivella 
Metzneria aprilella 
Metzneria artificella 
Metzneria lappella 
Metzneria metzneriella 
Metzneria neuropterella 
Metzneria paucipunctella 
Mirificarma cytisella 
Mirificarma eburnella 
Mirificarma interrupta 
Mirificarma lentiginosella 
Mirificarma maculatella 
Mirificarma mulinella 
Monochroa conspersella 
Monochroa cytisella 
Monochroa ferrea 
Monochroa hornigi 
Monochroa lutulentella 
Monochroa nomadella 
Monochroa palustrellus 
Monochroa scutatella 
Monochroa sepicolella 
Monochroa servella 
Monochroa suffusella 
Monochroa tenebrella 
Neofaculta ericetella 
Neofaculta infernella 
Neofriseria peliella 
Neotelphusa sequax 
Nothris congressariella 
Nothris lemniscellus 
Nothris verbascella 
Parachronistis albiceps 
Paranarsia joannisiella 
Pexicopia malvella 
Phthorimaea operculella 
Platyedra subcinerea 
Pogochaetia solitaria 
Prolita sexpunctella 
Prolita solutella 
Pseudotelphusa paripunctella 
Pseudotelphusa scalella 
Pseudotelphusa tessella 
Psoricoptera gibbosella 
Recurvaria leucatella 
Recurvaria nanella 
Sattleria melaleucella 
Sattleria triglavica 
Scrobipalpa acuminatella 
Scrobipalpa artemisiella 
Scrobipalpa atriplicella 
Scrobipalpa chrysanthemella 
Scrobipalpa feralella 
Scrobipalpa murinella 
Scrobipalpa obsoletella 
Scrobipalpa ocellatella 
Scrobipalpa pauperella 
Scrobipalpa proclivella 
Scrobipalpa samadensis 
Scrobipalpopsis petasitis 
Scrobipalpula diffluella 
Scrobipalpula psilella 
Scrobipalpula ramosella 
Scrobipalpula tussilaginis 
Sitotroga cerealella 
Sophronia humerella 
Sophronia semicostella 
Sophronia sicariellus 
Stenolechia gemmella 
Stenolechiodes pseudogemmellus 
Stomopteryx remissella 
Syncopacma albifrontella 
Syncopacma azosterella 
Syncopacma captivella 
Syncopacma cinctella 
Syncopacma cincticulella 
Syncopacma coronillella 
Syncopacma karvoneni 
Syncopacma larseniella 
Syncopacma patruella 
Syncopacma sangiella 
Syncopacma taeniolella 
Syncopacma vinella 
Syncopacma wormiella 
Teleiodes flavimaculella 
Teleiodes italica 
Teleiodes luculella 
Teleiodes saltuum 
Teleiodes vulgella 
Teleiodes wagae 
Teleiopsis albifemorella 
Teleiopsis bagriotella 
Teleiopsis diffinis 
Teleiopsis rosalbella 
Thiotricha subocellea 
Tila capsophilella 
Xystophora pulveratella

Geometridae
Abraxas grossulariata 
Abraxas sylvata 
Acasis appensata 
Acasis viretata 
Adactylotis contaminaria 
Aethalura punctulata 
Agriopis aurantiaria 
Agriopis bajaria 
Agriopis leucophaearia 
Agriopis marginaria 
Alcis bastelbergeri 
Alcis jubata 
Alcis repandata 
Aleucis distinctata 
Alsophila aceraria 
Alsophila aescularia 
Angerona prunaria 
Anticlea derivata 
Anticollix sparsata 
Apeira syringaria 
Aplasta ononaria 
Aplocera efformata 
Aplocera plagiata 
Aplocera praeformata 
Apocheima hispidaria 
Archiearis parthenias 
Arichanna melanaria 
Ascotis selenaria 
Aspitates gilvaria 
Asthena albulata 
Asthena anseraria 
Baptria tibiale 
Biston betularia 
Biston strataria 
Boudinotiana notha 
Bupalus piniaria 
Cabera exanthemata 
Cabera pusaria 
Campaea honoraria 
Campaea margaritaria 
Camptogramma bilineata 
Camptogramma scripturata 
Carsia lythoxylata 
Carsia sororiata 
Cataclysme riguata 
Catarhoe cuculata 
Catarhoe rubidata 
Cepphis advenaria 
Charissa obscurata 
Charissa italohelveticus 
Charissa pullata 
Charissa mucidaria 
Charissa variegata 
Charissa ambiguata 
Charissa intermedia 
Charissa glaucinaria 
Chesias legatella 
Chesias rufata 
Chiasmia clathrata 
Chlorissa cloraria 
Chlorissa viridata 
Chloroclysta miata 
Chloroclysta siterata 
Chloroclystis v-ata 
Cidaria fulvata 
Cleora cinctaria 
Cleorodes lichenaria 
Coenotephria ablutaria 
Coenotephria salicata 
Coenotephria tophaceata 
Colostygia aptata 
Colostygia aqueata 
Colostygia austriacaria 
Colostygia kollariaria 
Colostygia laetaria 
Colostygia multistrigaria 
Colostygia olivata 
Colostygia pectinataria 
Colostygia puengeleri 
Colostygia turbata 
Colotois pennaria 
Comibaena bajularia 
Cosmorhoe ocellata 
Costaconvexa polygrammata 
Crocallis elinguaria 
Crocallis tusciaria 
Crocota pseudotinctaria 
Crocota tinctaria 
Cyclophora linearia 
Cyclophora porata 
Cyclophora punctaria 
Cyclophora suppunctaria 
Cyclophora albiocellaria 
Cyclophora albipunctata 
Cyclophora annularia 
Cyclophora pendularia 
Cyclophora puppillaria 
Cyclophora quercimontaria 
Cyclophora ruficiliaria 
Deileptenia ribeata 
Dysstroma citrata 
Dysstroma truncata 
Earophila badiata 
Ecliptopera capitata 
Ecliptopera silaceata 
Ectropis crepuscularia 
Eilicrinia trinotata 
Electrophaes corylata 
Elophos andereggaria 
Elophos caelibaria 
Elophos operaria 
Elophos unicoloraria 
Elophos zelleraria 
Elophos dilucidaria 
Elophos dognini 
Elophos serotinaria 
Elophos vittaria 
Ematurga atomaria 
Emmiltis pygmaearia 
Ennomos alniaria 
Ennomos autumnaria 
Ennomos erosaria 
Ennomos fuscantaria 
Ennomos quercaria 
Ennomos quercinaria 
Entephria caesiata 
Entephria contestata 
Entephria cyanata 
Entephria flavicinctata 
Entephria infidaria 
Entephria nobiliaria 
Epilobophora sabinata 
Epione repandaria 
Epione vespertaria 
Epirranthis diversata 
Epirrhoe alternata 
Epirrhoe galiata 
Epirrhoe hastulata 
Epirrhoe molluginata 
Epirrhoe pupillata 
Epirrhoe rivata 
Epirrhoe tristata 
Epirrita autumnata 
Epirrita christyi 
Epirrita dilutata 
Erannis defoliaria 
Euchoeca nebulata 
Eulithis mellinata 
Eulithis populata 
Eulithis prunata 
Eulithis testata 
Euphyia biangulata 
Euphyia frustata 
Euphyia unangulata 
Eupithecia abbreviata 
Eupithecia abietaria 
Eupithecia absinthiata 
Eupithecia actaeata 
Eupithecia alliaria 
Eupithecia analoga 
Eupithecia assimilata 
Eupithecia breviculata 
Eupithecia carpophagata 
Eupithecia cauchiata 
Eupithecia centaureata 
Eupithecia conterminata 
Eupithecia cretaceata 
Eupithecia denotata 
Eupithecia denticulata 
Eupithecia dissertata 
Eupithecia distinctaria 
Eupithecia dodoneata 
Eupithecia egenaria 
Eupithecia ericeata 
Eupithecia exiguata 
Eupithecia expallidata 
Eupithecia extraversaria 
Eupithecia gemellata 
Eupithecia graphata 
Eupithecia gueneata 
Eupithecia haworthiata 
Eupithecia icterata 
Eupithecia immundata 
Eupithecia impurata 
Eupithecia indigata 
Eupithecia innotata 
Eupithecia insigniata 
Eupithecia intricata 
Eupithecia inturbata 
Eupithecia irriguata 
Eupithecia lanceata 
Eupithecia laquaearia 
Eupithecia lariciata 
Eupithecia linariata 
Eupithecia millefoliata 
Eupithecia nanata 
Eupithecia ochridata 
Eupithecia orphnata 
Eupithecia pauxillaria 
Eupithecia pernotata 
Eupithecia pimpinellata 
Eupithecia plumbeolata 
Eupithecia pulchellata 
Eupithecia pusillata 
Eupithecia pyreneata 
Eupithecia satyrata 
Eupithecia schiefereri 
Eupithecia selinata 
Eupithecia semigraphata 
Eupithecia silenata 
Eupithecia simpliciata 
Eupithecia sinuosaria 
Eupithecia subfuscata 
Eupithecia subumbrata 
Eupithecia succenturiata 
Eupithecia tantillaria 
Eupithecia tenuiata 
Eupithecia thalictrata 
Eupithecia tripunctaria 
Eupithecia trisignaria 
Eupithecia undata 
Eupithecia unedonata 
Eupithecia valerianata 
Eupithecia venosata 
Eupithecia veratraria 
Eupithecia virgaureata 
Eupithecia vulgata 
Eustroma reticulata 
Fagivorina arenaria 
Gagitodes sagittata 
Gandaritis pyraliata 
Geometra papilionaria 
Glacies alpinata 
Glacies alticolaria 
Glacies bentelii 
Glacies canaliculata 
Glacies coracina 
Glacies wehrlii 
Gnophos furvata 
Gnophos obfuscata 
Gymnoscelis rufifasciata 
Heliomata glarearia 
Hemistola chrysoprasaria 
Hemithea aestivaria 
Horisme aemulata 
Horisme aquata 
Horisme calligraphata 
Horisme radicaria 
Horisme tersata 
Horisme vitalbata 
Hydrelia flammeolaria 
Hydrelia sylvata 
Hydria cervinalis 
Hydria montivagata 
Hydria undulata 
Hydriomena furcata 
Hydriomena impluviata 
Hydriomena ruberata 
Hylaea fasciaria 
Hypomecis punctinalis 
Hypomecis roboraria 
Hypoxystis pluviaria 
Idaea aureolaria 
Idaea aversata 
Idaea biselata 
Idaea calunetaria 
Idaea contiguaria 
Idaea degeneraria 
Idaea deversaria 
Idaea dilutaria 
Idaea dimidiata 
Idaea distinctaria 
Idaea emarginata 
Idaea filicata 
Idaea flaveolaria 
Idaea fuscovenosa 
Idaea humiliata 
Idaea inquinata 
Idaea laevigata 
Idaea macilentaria 
Idaea moniliata 
Idaea muricata 
Idaea nitidata 
Idaea obsoletaria 
Idaea ochrata 
Idaea pallidata 
Idaea politaria 
Idaea rubraria 
Idaea rufaria 
Idaea rusticata 
Idaea seriata 
Idaea sericeata 
Idaea serpentata 
Idaea straminata 
Idaea subsericeata 
Idaea sylvestraria 
Idaea trigeminata 
Idaea typicata 
Idaea vesubiata 
Isturgia arenacearia 
Isturgia limbaria 
Isturgia murinaria 
Jodis lactearia 
Jodis putata 
Lampropteryx suffumata 
Larentia clavaria 
Ligdia adustata 
Lithostege griseata 
Lobophora halterata 
Lomaspilis marginata 
Lomographa bimaculata 
Lomographa temerata 
Lycia alpina 
Lycia hirtaria 
Lycia isabellae 
Lycia pomonaria 
Lycia zonaria 
Lythria plumularia 
Lythria purpuraria 
Macaria alternata 
Macaria artesiaria 
Macaria brunneata 
Macaria carbonaria 
Macaria fusca 
Macaria liturata 
Macaria notata 
Macaria signaria 
Macaria wauaria 
Martania taeniata 
Melanthia alaudaria 
Melanthia procellata 
Menophra abruptaria 
Menophra nycthemeraria 
Mesoleuca albicillata 
Mesotype didymata 
Mesotype parallelolineata 
Mesotype verberata 
Minoa murinata 
Nebula achromaria 
Nebula nebulata 
Nothocasis sertata 
Nychiodes dalmatina 
Nychiodes obscuraria 
Nycterosea obstipata 
Odezia atrata 
Odontopera bidentata 
Operophtera brumata 
Operophtera fagata 
Opisthograptis luteolata 
Orthonama vittata 
Ourapteryx sambucaria 
Pachycnemia hippocastanaria 
Paradarisa consonaria 
Parectropis similaria 
Pareulype berberata 
Pasiphila chloerata 
Pasiphila debiliata 
Pasiphila rectangulata 
Pelurga comitata 
Pennithera firmata 
Perconia strigillaria 
Peribatodes perversaria 
Peribatodes rhomboidaria 
Peribatodes secundaria 
Peribatodes umbraria 
Perizoma affinitata 
Perizoma albulata 
Perizoma alchemillata 
Perizoma bifaciata 
Perizoma blandiata 
Perizoma flavofasciata 
Perizoma hydrata 
Perizoma incultaria 
Perizoma lugdunaria 
Perizoma minorata 
Perizoma obsoletata 
Petrophora chlorosata 
Phaiogramma etruscaria 
Phibalapteryx virgata 
Phigalia pilosaria 
Philereme transversata 
Philereme vetulata 
Plagodis dolabraria 
Plagodis pulveraria 
Plemyria rubiginata 
Pseudopanthera macularia 
Pseudoterpna pruinata 
Psodos quadrifaria 
Pterapherapteryx sexalata 
Pungeleria capreolaria 
Rheumaptera hastata 
Rheumaptera subhastata 
Rhodometra sacraria 
Rhodostrophia calabra 
Rhodostrophia vibicaria 
Rhoptria asperaria 
Sciadia tenebraria 
Scopula confinaria 
Scopula floslactata 
Scopula imitaria 
Scopula immutata 
Scopula incanata 
Scopula marginepunctata 
Scopula subpunctaria 
Scopula ternata 
Scopula caricaria 
Scopula corrivalaria 
Scopula decorata 
Scopula immorata 
Scopula nemoraria 
Scopula nigropunctata 
Scopula ornata 
Scopula rubiginata 
Scopula submutata 
Scopula umbelaria 
Scopula virgulata 
Scotopteryx angularia 
Scotopteryx bipunctaria 
Scotopteryx chenopodiata 
Scotopteryx coarctaria 
Scotopteryx luridata 
Scotopteryx moeniata 
Scotopteryx mucronata 
Scotopteryx octodurensis 
Scotopteryx peribolata 
Scotopteryx vicinaria 
Selenia dentaria 
Selenia lunularia 
Selenia tetralunaria 
Selidosema brunnearia 
Selidosema plumaria 
Selidosema taeniolaria 
Siona lineata 
Spargania luctuata 
Stegania cararia 
Stegania trimaculata 
Synopsia sociaria 
Tephronia sepiaria 
Thalera fimbrialis 
Thera britannica 
Thera cembrae 
Thera cognata 
Thera cupressata 
Thera juniperata 
Thera obeliscata 
Thera variata 
Thera vetustata 
Theria primaria 
Theria rupicapraria 
Thetidia smaragdaria 
Timandra comae 
Trichopteryx carpinata 
Trichopteryx polycommata 
Triphosa dubitata 
Triphosa sabaudiata 
Venusia blomeri 
Venusia cambrica 
Xanthorhoe biriviata 
Xanthorhoe decoloraria 
Xanthorhoe designata 
Xanthorhoe ferrugata 
Xanthorhoe fluctuata 
Xanthorhoe incursata 
Xanthorhoe montanata 
Xanthorhoe quadrifasiata 
Xanthorhoe spadicearia

Glyphipterigidae
Acrolepia autumnitella 
Acrolepiopsis assectella 
Acrolepiopsis betulella 
Acrolepiopsis marcidella 
Acrolepiopsis tauricella 
Digitivalva arnicella 
Digitivalva perlepidella 
Digitivalva reticulella 
Digitivalva granitella 
Digitivalva pulicariae 
Glyphipterix bergstraesserella 
Glyphipterix equitella 
Glyphipterix forsterella 
Glyphipterix fuscoviridella 
Glyphipterix gianelliella 
Glyphipterix haworthana 
Glyphipterix nicaeella 
Glyphipterix simpliciella 
Glyphipterix thrasonella 
Orthotelia sparganella

Gracillariidae
Acrocercops brongniardella 
Aristaea pavoniella 
Aspilapteryx limosella 
Aspilapteryx tringipennella 
Callisto coffeella 
Callisto denticulella 
Callisto insperatella 
Callisto pfaffenzelleri 
Caloptilia alchimiella 
Caloptilia azaleella 
Caloptilia betulicola 
Caloptilia cuculipennella 
Caloptilia elongella 
Caloptilia falconipennella 
Caloptilia fidella 
Caloptilia fribergensis 
Caloptilia hauderi 
Caloptilia hemidactylella 
Caloptilia populetorum 
Caloptilia rhodinella 
Caloptilia robustella 
Caloptilia roscipennella 
Caloptilia rufipennella 
Caloptilia semifascia 
Caloptilia stigmatella 
Caloptilia suberinella 
Calybites phasianipennella 
Cameraria ohridella 
Dialectica scalariella 
Euspilapteryx auroguttella 
Gracillaria loriolella 
Gracillaria syringella 
Leucospilapteryx omissella 
Micrurapteryx kollariella 
Parectopa ononidis 
Parectopa robiniella 
Parornix alpicola 
Parornix anglicella 
Parornix anguliferella 
Parornix atripalpella 
Parornix betulae 
Parornix carpinella 
Parornix devoniella 
Parornix fagivora 
Parornix finitimella 
Parornix petiolella 
Parornix scoticella 
Parornix torquillella 
Phyllocnistis labyrinthella 
Phyllocnistis saligna 
Phyllocnistis unipunctella 
Phyllocnistis xenia 
Phyllonorycter acerifoliella 
Phyllonorycter alpina 
Phyllonorycter apparella 
Phyllonorycter blancardella 
Phyllonorycter cavella 
Phyllonorycter cerasicolella 
Phyllonorycter cerasinella 
Phyllonorycter comparella 
Phyllonorycter connexella 
Phyllonorycter coryli 
Phyllonorycter corylifoliella 
Phyllonorycter delitella 
Phyllonorycter deschkai 
Phyllonorycter distentella 
Phyllonorycter dubitella 
Phyllonorycter emberizaepenella 
Phyllonorycter esperella 
Phyllonorycter fraxinella 
Phyllonorycter froelichiella 
Phyllonorycter geniculella 
Phyllonorycter harrisella 
Phyllonorycter heegeriella 
Phyllonorycter helianthemella 
Phyllonorycter hilarella 
Phyllonorycter ilicifoliella 
Phyllonorycter insignitella 
Phyllonorycter joannisi 
Phyllonorycter junoniella 
Phyllonorycter klemannella 
Phyllonorycter lantanella 
Phyllonorycter lautella 
Phyllonorycter leucographella 
Phyllonorycter maestingella 
Phyllonorycter mespilella 
Phyllonorycter messaniella 
Phyllonorycter millierella 
Phyllonorycter muelleriella 
Phyllonorycter nicellii 
Phyllonorycter nigrescentella 
Phyllonorycter oxyacanthae 
Phyllonorycter parisiella 
Phyllonorycter pastorella 
Phyllonorycter platani 
Phyllonorycter populifoliella 
Phyllonorycter quercifoliella 
Phyllonorycter quinqueguttella 
Phyllonorycter rajella 
Phyllonorycter robiniella 
Phyllonorycter roboris 
Phyllonorycter sagitella 
Phyllonorycter salicicolella 
Phyllonorycter salictella 
Phyllonorycter scabiosella 
Phyllonorycter schreberella 
Phyllonorycter scitulella 
Phyllonorycter sorbi 
Phyllonorycter spinicolella 
Phyllonorycter stettinensis 
Phyllonorycter strigulatella 
Phyllonorycter tenerella 
Phyllonorycter trifasciella 
Phyllonorycter tristrigella 
Phyllonorycter ulmifoliella 
Povolnya leucapennella 
Sauterina hofmanniella 
Spulerina simploniella

Heliodinidae
Heliodines roesella

Heliozelidae
Antispila metallella 
Antispila treitschkiella 
Heliozela resplendella 
Heliozela sericiella

Hepialidae
Gazoryctra ganna 
Hepialus humuli 
Pharmacis carna 
Pharmacis fusconebulosa 
Pharmacis lupulina 
Phymatopus hecta 
Triodia sylvina

Heterogynidae
Heterogynis penella

Incurvariidae
Alloclemensia mesospilella 
Incurvaria koerneriella 
Incurvaria masculella 
Incurvaria oehlmanniella 
Incurvaria pectinea 
Incurvaria praelatella 
Incurvaria vetulella 
Phylloporia bistrigella

Lasiocampidae
Cosmotriche lobulina 
Dendrolimus pini 
Eriogaster arbusculae 
Eriogaster catax 
Eriogaster lanestris 
Eriogaster rimicola 
Euthrix potatoria 
Gastropacha quercifolia 
Gastropacha populifolia 
Lasiocampa quercus 
Lasiocampa trifolii 
Macrothylacia rubi 
Malacosoma castrensis 
Malacosoma neustria 
Malacosoma alpicola 
Odonestis pruni 
Phyllodesma ilicifolia 
Phyllodesma tremulifolia 
Poecilocampa alpina 
Poecilocampa populi 
Trichiura crataegi

Lecithoceridae
Homaloxestis briantiella 
Lecithocera nigrana

Limacodidae
Apoda limacodes 
Heterogenea asella

Lyonetiidae
Leucoptera laburnella 
Leucoptera lotella 
Leucoptera malifoliella 
Leucoptera sinuella 
Leucoptera spartifoliella 
Lyonetia clerkella 
Lyonetia prunifoliella 
Lyonetia pulverulentella 
Phyllobrostis hartmanni

Lypusidae
Amphisbatis incongruella 
Lypusa maurella 
Pseudatemelia colurnella 
Pseudatemelia flavifrontella 
Pseudatemelia subochreella 
Pseudatemelia synchrozella 
Pseudatemelia josephinae

Micropterigidae
Micropterix aglaella 
Micropterix allionella 
Micropterix aruncella 
Micropterix aureatella 
Micropterix aureoviridella 
Micropterix calthella 
Micropterix isobasella 
Micropterix mansuetella 
Micropterix osthelderi 
Micropterix paykullella 
Micropterix rothenbachii 
Micropterix schaefferi 
Micropterix tunbergella

Millieridae
Millieria dolosalis

Momphidae
Mompha langiella 
Mompha idaei 
Mompha miscella 
Mompha conturbatella 
Mompha divisella 
Mompha epilobiella 
Mompha jurassicella 
Mompha lacteella 
Mompha ochraceella 
Mompha propinquella 
Mompha sturnipennella 
Mompha subbistrigella 
Mompha locupletella 
Mompha raschkiella 
Mompha terminella

Nepticulidae
Acalyptris platani 
Bohemannia auriciliella 
Bohemannia pulverosella 
Bohemannia quadrimaculella 
Ectoedemia agrimoniae 
Ectoedemia albifasciella 
Ectoedemia angulifasciella 
Ectoedemia arcuatella 
Ectoedemia argyropeza 
Ectoedemia atricollis 
Ectoedemia hannoverella 
Ectoedemia heringi 
Ectoedemia intimella 
Ectoedemia klimeschi 
Ectoedemia mahalebella 
Ectoedemia minimella 
Ectoedemia occultella 
Ectoedemia pubescivora 
Ectoedemia rubivora 
Ectoedemia rufifrontella 
Ectoedemia spinosella 
Ectoedemia subbimaculella 
Ectoedemia turbidella 
Ectoedemia albibimaculella 
Ectoedemia decentella 
Ectoedemia louisella 
Ectoedemia sericopeza 
Ectoedemia septembrella 
Ectoedemia weaveri 
Ectoedemia amani 
Ectoedemia atrifrontella 
Ectoedemia liebwerdella 
Ectoedemia longicaudella 
Ectoedemia reichli 
Enteucha acetosae 
Parafomoria helianthemella 
Stigmella aceris 
Stigmella aeneofasciella 
Stigmella alnetella 
Stigmella anomalella 
Stigmella assimilella 
Stigmella atricapitella 
Stigmella aurella 
Stigmella basiguttella 
Stigmella betulicola 
Stigmella carpinella 
Stigmella catharticella 
Stigmella centifoliella 
Stigmella confusella 
Stigmella continuella 
Stigmella crataegella 
Stigmella desperatella 
Stigmella dorsiguttella 
Stigmella dryadella 
Stigmella floslactella 
Stigmella freyella 
Stigmella glutinosae 
Stigmella hemargyrella 
Stigmella hybnerella 
Stigmella incognitella 
Stigmella lapponica 
Stigmella lemniscella 
Stigmella lonicerarum 
Stigmella luteella 
Stigmella magdalenae 
Stigmella malella 
Stigmella mespilicola 
Stigmella microtheriella 
Stigmella minusculella 
Stigmella myrtillella 
Stigmella naturnella 
Stigmella nylandriella 
Stigmella obliquella 
Stigmella oxyacanthella 
Stigmella pallidiciliella 
Stigmella paradoxa 
Stigmella perpygmaeella 
Stigmella plagicolella 
Stigmella poterii 
Stigmella pretiosa 
Stigmella prunetorum 
Stigmella pyri 
Stigmella regiella 
Stigmella rhamnella 
Stigmella roborella 
Stigmella rolandi 
Stigmella ruficapitella 
Stigmella sakhalinella 
Stigmella salicis 
Stigmella samiatella 
Stigmella sanguisorbae 
Stigmella sorbi 
Stigmella speciosa 
Stigmella splendidissimella 
Stigmella stelviana 
Stigmella svenssoni 
Stigmella thuringiaca 
Stigmella tiliae 
Stigmella tityrella 
Stigmella trimaculella 
Stigmella ulmivora 
Stigmella vimineticola 
Stigmella viscerella 
Trifurcula headleyella 
Trifurcula melanoptera 
Trifurcula cryptella 
Trifurcula eurema 
Trifurcula ortneri 
Trifurcula immundella 
Trifurcula pallidella 
Trifurcula serotinella 
Trifurcula silviae 
Trifurcula subnitidella

Noctuidae
Abrostola agnorista 
Abrostola asclepiadis 
Abrostola tripartita 
Abrostola triplasia 
Acontia lucida 
Acontia trabealis 
Acosmetia caliginosa 
Acronicta aceris 
Acronicta leporina 
Acronicta strigosa 
Acronicta alni 
Acronicta cuspis 
Acronicta psi 
Acronicta tridens 
Acronicta auricoma 
Acronicta cinerea 
Acronicta euphorbiae 
Acronicta menyanthidis 
Acronicta rumicis 
Actebia praecox 
Actebia multifida 
Actinotia polyodon 
Actinotia radiosa 
Aedia funesta 
Aedia leucomelas 
Agrochola lychnidis 
Agrochola helvola 
Agrochola humilis 
Agrochola litura 
Agrochola nitida 
Agrochola pistacinoides 
Agrochola lota 
Agrochola macilenta 
Agrochola laevis 
Agrochola circellaris 
Agrotis bigramma 
Agrotis cinerea 
Agrotis clavis 
Agrotis exclamationis 
Agrotis fatidica 
Agrotis ipsilon 
Agrotis obesa 
Agrotis puta 
Agrotis segetum 
Agrotis simplonia 
Agrotis trux 
Agrotis vestigialis 
Allophyes oxyacanthae 
Ammoconia caecimacula 
Ammoconia senex 
Amphipoea fucosa 
Amphipoea lucens 
Amphipoea oculea 
Amphipyra berbera 
Amphipyra livida 
Amphipyra perflua 
Amphipyra pyramidea 
Amphipyra tetra 
Amphipyra tragopoginis 
Amphipyra cinnamomea 
Anaplectoides prasina 
Anarta myrtilli 
Anarta melanopa 
Anarta odontites 
Anarta pugnax 
Anarta trifolii 
Anorthoa munda 
Antitype chi 
Antitype suda 
Apamea anceps 
Apamea aquila 
Apamea crenata 
Apamea epomidion 
Apamea furva 
Apamea illyria 
Apamea lateritia 
Apamea lithoxylaea 
Apamea maillardi 
Apamea monoglypha 
Apamea oblonga 
Apamea platinea 
Apamea remissa 
Apamea rubrirena 
Apamea scolopacina 
Apamea sordens 
Apamea sublustris 
Apamea unanimis 
Apamea zeta 
Aporophyla canescens 
Aporophyla lueneburgensis 
Aporophyla nigra 
Apterogenum ypsillon 
Archanara dissoluta 
Archanara neurica 
Arenostola phragmitidis 
Asteroscopus sphinx 
Atethmia ambusta 
Atethmia centrago 
Athetis gluteosa 
Athetis pallustris 
Athetis hospes 
Atypha pulmonaris 
Auchmis detersa 
Autographa aemula 
Autographa bractea 
Autographa gamma 
Autographa jota 
Autographa pulchrina 
Axylia putris 
Brachionycha nubeculosa 
Brachylomia viminalis 
Bryophila petricolor 
Bryophila raptricula 
Bryophila ravula 
Bryophila domestica 
Calamia tridens 
Calliergis ramosa 
Callopistria juventina 
Callopistria latreillei 
Calophasia lunula 
Calophasia opalina 
Calophasia platyptera 
Caradrina morpheus 
Caradrina gilva 
Caradrina ingrata 
Caradrina clavipalpis 
Caradrina flavirena 
Caradrina selini 
Caradrina wullschlegeli 
Caradrina aspersa 
Caradrina kadenii 
Caradrina montana 
Caradrina terrea 
Ceramica pisi 
Cerapteryx graminis 
Cerastis leucographa 
Cerastis rubricosa 
Charanyca trigrammica 
Charanyca ferruginea 
Chersotis alpestris 
Chersotis andereggii 
Chersotis cuprea 
Chersotis fimbriola 
Chersotis margaritacea 
Chersotis multangula 
Chersotis ocellina 
Chersotis oreina 
Chersotis rectangula 
Chilodes maritima 
Chloantha hyperici 
Chrysodeixis chalcites 
Clemathada calberlai 
Cleoceris scoriacea 
Cleonymia yvanii 
Coenobia rufa 
Colocasia coryli 
Conisania poelli 
Conisania luteago 
Conistra ligula 
Conistra rubiginosa 
Conistra vaccinii 
Conistra veronicae 
Conistra erythrocephala 
Conistra rubiginea 
Conistra staudingeri 
Conistra torrida 
Coranarta cordigera 
Cornutiplusia circumflexa 
Cosmia trapezina 
Cosmia diffinis 
Cosmia pyralina 
Cosmia affinis 
Craniophora ligustri 
Cryphia fraudatricula 
Cryphia receptricula 
Cryphia simulatricula 
Cryphia algae 
Cryphia ochsi 
Crypsedra gemmea 
Cucullia absinthii 
Cucullia argentea 
Cucullia artemisiae 
Cucullia asteris 
Cucullia campanulae 
Cucullia chamomillae 
Cucullia gnaphalii 
Cucullia lactucae 
Cucullia lucifuga 
Cucullia santonici 
Cucullia tanaceti 
Cucullia umbratica 
Cucullia xeranthemi 
Cucullia caninae 
Cucullia lanceolata 
Cucullia lychnitis 
Cucullia prenanthis 
Cucullia scrophulariae 
Cucullia verbasci 
Dasypolia ferdinandi 
Dasypolia templi 
Deltote bankiana 
Deltote deceptoria 
Deltote uncula 
Deltote pygarga 
Denticucullus pygmina 
Diachrysia chrysitis 
Diachrysia chryson 
Diachrysia nadeja 
Diachrysia stenochrysis 
Diachrysia zosimi 
Diarsia brunnea 
Diarsia dahlii 
Diarsia mendica 
Diarsia rubi 
Dichagyris flammatra 
Dichagyris musiva 
Dichagyris candelisequa 
Dichagyris forcipula 
Dichagyris nigrescens 
Dichagyris renigera 
Dichagyris signifera 
Dichagyris vallesiaca 
Dichonia convergens 
Dicycla oo 
Diloba caeruleocephala 
Dryobota labecula 
Dryobotodes eremita 
Dryobotodes monochroma 
Dryobotodes roboris 
Dypterygia scabriuscula 
Egira conspicillaris 
Elaphria venustula 
Enargia paleacea 
Enterpia laudeti 
Epilecta linogrisea 
Epimecia ustula 
Epipsilia grisescens 
Epipsilia latens 
Episema glaucina 
Eremobia ochroleuca 
Eucarta amethystina 
Eucarta virgo 
Euchalcia modestoides 
Euchalcia variabilis 
Eugnorisma glareosa 
Eugnorisma depuncta 
Eugraphe sigma 
Euplexia lucipara 
Eupsilia transversa 
Eurois occulta 
Euxoa aquilina 
Euxoa birivia 
Euxoa cos 
Euxoa culminicola 
Euxoa decora 
Euxoa distinguenda 
Euxoa eruta 
Euxoa nigricans 
Euxoa obelisca 
Euxoa recussa 
Euxoa segnilis 
Euxoa temera 
Euxoa tritici 
Euxoa vitta 
Fabula zollikoferi 
Globia algae 
Gortyna flavago 
Graphiphora augur 
Griposia aprilina 
Hada plebeja 
Hadena irregularis 
Hadena perplexa 
Hadena albimacula 
Hadena bicruris 
Hadena caesia 
Hadena clara 
Hadena compta 
Hadena confusa 
Hadena filograna 
Hadena luteocincta 
Hadena magnolii 
Hadena tephroleuca 
Hecatera bicolorata 
Hecatera dysodea 
Helicoverpa armigera 
Heliothis maritima 
Heliothis nubigera 
Heliothis ononis 
Heliothis peltigera 
Heliothis viriplaca 
Helotropha leucostigma 
Hoplodrina ambigua 
Hoplodrina blanda 
Hoplodrina octogenaria 
Hoplodrina respersa 
Hoplodrina superstes 
Hydraecia micacea 
Hydraecia petasitis 
Hyppa rectilinea 
Hyssia cavernosa 
Ipimorpha retusa 
Ipimorpha subtusa 
Jodia croceago 
Lacanobia contigua 
Lacanobia suasa 
Lacanobia thalassina 
Lacanobia aliena 
Lacanobia oleracea 
Lacanobia splendens 
Lacanobia w-latinum 
Lamprosticta culta 
Lamprotes c-aureum 
Lasionycta imbecilla 
Lasionycta proxima 
Lateroligia ophiogramma 
Lenisa geminipuncta 
Leucania loreyi 
Leucania comma 
Leucania obsoleta 
Lithophane consocia 
Lithophane furcifera 
Lithophane lamda 
Lithophane merckii 
Lithophane ornitopus 
Lithophane semibrunnea 
Lithophane socia 
Lithophane leautieri 
Litoligia literosa 
Luperina dumerilii 
Luperina rubella 
Luperina testacea 
Lycophotia porphyrea 
Macdunnoughia confusa 
Mamestra brassicae 
Meganephria bimaculosa 
Melanchra persicariae 
Mesapamea remmi 
Mesapamea secalella 
Mesapamea secalis 
Mesogona acetosellae 
Mesogona oxalina 
Mesoligia furuncula 
Mniotype adusta 
Mniotype satura 
Mniotype solieri 
Moma alpium 
Mormo maura 
Mythimna albipuncta 
Mythimna ferrago 
Mythimna l-album 
Mythimna conigera 
Mythimna impura 
Mythimna pallens 
Mythimna pudorina 
Mythimna straminea 
Mythimna turca 
Mythimna vitellina 
Mythimna unipuncta 
Mythimna andereggii 
Mythimna sicula 
Naenia typica 
Noctua comes 
Noctua fimbriata 
Noctua interjecta 
Noctua interposita 
Noctua janthe 
Noctua janthina 
Noctua orbona 
Noctua pronuba 
Noctua tirrenica 
Nonagria typhae 
Nyctobrya muralis 
Ochropleura leucogaster 
Ochropleura plecta 
Oligia dubia 
Oligia fasciuncula 
Oligia latruncula 
Oligia strigilis 
Oligia versicolor 
Omia cymbalariae 
Opigena polygona 
Orbona fragariae 
Oria musculosa 
Orthosia gracilis 
Orthosia opima 
Orthosia cerasi 
Orthosia cruda 
Orthosia miniosa 
Orthosia populeti 
Orthosia incerta 
Orthosia gothica 
Pachetra sagittigera 
Panchrysia aurea 
Panchrysia v-argenteum 
Panemeria tenebrata 
Panolis flammea 
Panthea coenobita 
Papestra biren 
Paradiarsia punicea 
Parastichtis suspecta 
Peridroma saucia 
Periphanes delphinii 
Phlogophora meticulosa 
Phlogophora scita 
Photedes captiuncula 
Photedes extrema 
Photedes fluxa 
Photedes minima 
Phragmatiphila nexa 
Phyllophila obliterata 
Plusia festucae 
Plusia putnami 
Polia bombycina 
Polia hepatica 
Polia nebulosa 
Polia serratilinea 
Polychrysia moneta 
Polymixis dubia 
Polymixis flavicincta 
Polymixis polymita 
Polymixis rufocincta 
Polymixis xanthomista 
Polyphaenis sericata 
Protolampra sobrina 
Protoschinia scutosa 
Pseudeustrotia candidula 
Pseudluperina pozzii 
Pyrrhia umbra 
Rhizedra lutosa 
Rhyacia helvetina 
Rhyacia lucipeta 
Rhyacia simulans 
Schinia cardui 
Scotochrosta pulla 
Sedina buettneri 
Sideridis rivularis 
Sideridis kitti 
Sideridis reticulata 
Sideridis lampra 
Sideridis turbida 
Simyra albovenosa 
Simyra nervosa 
Spaelotis ravida 
Spaelotis senna 
Spaelotis suecica 
Spodoptera exigua 
Spodoptera littoralis 
Standfussiana dalmata 
Standfussiana lucernea 
Standfussiana wiskotti 
Staurophora celsia 
Subacronicta megacephala 
Sympistis funebris 
Sympistis nigrita 
Syngrapha ain 
Syngrapha devergens 
Syngrapha hochenwarthi 
Syngrapha interrogationis 
Teinoptera olivina 
Thalpophila matura 
Tholera cespitis 
Tholera decimalis 
Thysanoplusia orichalcea 
Tiliacea aurago 
Tiliacea citrago 
Tiliacea sulphurago 
Trachea atriplicis 
Trichoplusia ni 
Trichosea ludifica 
Trigonophora flammea 
Tyta luctuosa 
Valeria jaspidea 
Valeria oleagina 
Xanthia gilvago 
Xanthia icteritia 
Xanthia ocellaris 
Xanthia ruticilla 
Xanthia togata 
Xestia ashworthii 
Xestia c-nigrum 
Xestia ditrapezium 
Xestia triangulum 
Xestia alpicola 
Xestia lorezi 
Xestia rhaetica 
Xestia sincera 
Xestia speciosa 
Xestia viridescens 
Xestia agathina 
Xestia baja 
Xestia castanea 
Xestia collina 
Xestia ochreago 
Xestia sexstrigata 
Xestia stigmatica 
Xestia xanthographa 
Xylena solidaginis 
Xylena exsoleta 
Xylena vetusta 
Xylocampa areola

Nolidae
Bena bicolorana 
Earias clorana 
Earias vernana 
Meganola albula 
Meganola strigula 
Nola aerugula 
Nola chlamitulalis 
Nola cicatricalis 
Nola confusalis 
Nola cristatula 
Nola cucullatella 
Nola subchlamydula 
Nycteola asiatica 
Nycteola columbana 
Nycteola degenerana 
Nycteola revayana 
Nycteola siculana 
Pseudoips prasinana

Notodontidae
Cerura erminea 
Cerura vinula 
Clostera anachoreta 
Clostera anastomosis 
Clostera curtula 
Clostera pigra 
Dicranura ulmi 
Drymonia dodonaea 
Drymonia obliterata 
Drymonia querna 
Drymonia ruficornis 
Drymonia velitaris 
Furcula bicuspis 
Furcula bifida 
Furcula furcula 
Gluphisia crenata 
Harpyia milhauseri 
Leucodonta bicoloria 
Notodonta dromedarius 
Notodonta torva 
Notodonta tritophus 
Notodonta ziczac 
Odontosia carmelita 
Peridea anceps 
Phalera bucephala 
Pheosia gnoma 
Pheosia tremula 
Pterostoma palpina 
Ptilodon capucina 
Ptilodon cucullina 
Ptilophora plumigera 
Spatalia argentina 
Stauropus fagi 
Thaumetopoea pityocampa 
Thaumetopoea processionea

Oecophoridae
Alabonia geoffrella 
Alabonia staintoniella 
Aplota nigricans 
Aplota palpella 
Batia internella 
Batia lambdella 
Batia lunaris 
Bisigna procerella 
Borkhausenia fuscescens 
Borkhausenia luridicomella 
Borkhausenia minutella 
Crassa tinctella 
Dasycera oliviella 
Decantha borkhausenii 
Denisia augustella 
Denisia fuscicapitella 
Denisia nubilosella 
Denisia rhaetica 
Denisia similella 
Denisia stipella 
Denisia stroemella 
Endrosis sarcitrella 
Epicallima formosella 
Goidanichiana jourdheuillella 
Harpella forficella 
Herrichia excelsella 
Hofmannophila pseudospretella 
Metalampra cinnamomea 
Minetia crinitus 
Oecophora bractella 
Pleurota marginella 
Pleurota bicostella 
Pleurota proteella 
Pleurota pyropella 
Pleurota punctella 
Schiffermuelleria schaefferella 
Schiffermuelleria grandis

Opostegidae
Opostega salaciella 
Pseudopostega auritella 
Pseudopostega crepusculella

Peleopodidae
Carcina quercana

Plutellidae
Eidophasia messingiella 
Plutella xylostella 
Plutella geniatella 
Plutella porrectella 
Rhigognostis annulatella 
Rhigognostis hufnagelii 
Rhigognostis incarnatella 
Rhigognostis senilella

Praydidae
Atemelia torquatella 
Prays fraxinella 
Prays ruficeps

Prodoxidae
Lampronia capitella 
Lampronia corticella 
Lampronia flavimitrella 
Lampronia luzella 
Lampronia morosa 
Lampronia provectella 
Lampronia rupella 
Lampronia splendidella 
Lampronia standfussiella

Psychidae
Acanthopsyche atra 
Anaproutia comitella 
Apterona crenulella 
Apterona helicoidella 
Bacotia claustrella 
Bijugis bombycella 
Brevantennia siederi 
Canephora hirsuta 
Dahlica charlottae 
Dahlica generosensis 
Dahlica goppensteinensis 
Dahlica klimeschi 
Dahlica lazuri 
Dahlica leoi 
Dahlica lichenella 
Dahlica sauteri 
Dahlica seileri 
Dahlica simplonica 
Dahlica ticinensis 
Dahlica triquetrella 
Dahlica vaudella 
Dahlica wehrlii 
Diplodoma laichartingella 
Epichnopterix alpina 
Epichnopterix kovacsi 
Epichnopterix montana 
Epichnopterix plumella 
Epichnopterix pontbrillantella 
Epichnopterix sieboldi 
Eumasia parietariella 
Leptopterix plumistrella 
Luffia ferchaultella 
Luffia lapidella 
Megalophanes turatii 
Narycia astrella 
Narycia duplicella 
Oreopsyche tenella 
Oreopsyche vorbrodtella 
Pachythelia villosella 
Phalacropterix graslinella 
Phalacropterix praecellens 
Postsolenobia thomanni 
Proutia betulina 
Pseudobankesia alpestrella 
Pseudobankesia contractella 
Psyche casta 
Psyche crassiorella 
Ptilocephala albida 
Ptilocephala plumifera 
Ptilocephala pyrenaella 
Rebelia ferruginans 
Rebelia herrichiella 
Rebelia kruegeri 
Rebelia sapho 
Rebelia thomanni 
Siederia alpicolella 
Siederia listerella 
Siederia rupicolella 
Sterrhopterix fusca 
Sterrhopterix standfussi 
Taleporia politella 
Taleporia tubulosa 
Typhonia beatricis 
Typhonia ciliaris

Pterophoridae
Adaina microdactyla 
Agdistis adactyla 
Agdistis tamaricis 
Amblyptilia acanthadactyla 
Amblyptilia punctidactyla 
Buckleria paludum 
Calyciphora albodactylus 
Calyciphora nephelodactyla 
Capperia britanniodactylus 
Capperia celeusi 
Capperia fusca 
Capperia trichodactyla 
Cnaemidophorus rhododactyla 
Crombrugghia distans 
Crombrugghia kollari 
Crombrugghia tristis 
Emmelina argoteles 
Emmelina monodactyla 
Geina didactyla 
Gillmeria ochrodactyla 
Gillmeria pallidactyla 
Hellinsia carphodactyla 
Hellinsia chrysocomae 
Hellinsia didactylites 
Hellinsia distinctus 
Hellinsia lienigianus 
Hellinsia osteodactylus 
Hellinsia pectodactylus 
Hellinsia tephradactyla 
Marasmarcha lunaedactyla 
Marasmarcha oxydactylus 
Merrifieldia baliodactylus 
Merrifieldia leucodactyla 
Merrifieldia tridactyla 
Oidaematophorus lithodactyla 
Oidaematophorus rogenhoferi 
Oxyptilus chrysodactyla 
Oxyptilus ericetorum 
Oxyptilus parvidactyla 
Oxyptilus pilosellae 
Paraplatyptilia metzneri 
Platyptilia calodactyla 
Platyptilia farfarellus 
Platyptilia gonodactyla 
Platyptilia nemoralis 
Platyptilia tesseradactyla 
Pselnophorus heterodactyla 
Pterophorus pentadactyla 
Stangeia siceliota 
Stenoptilia annadactyla 
Stenoptilia bipunctidactyla 
Stenoptilia coprodactylus 
Stenoptilia graphodactyla 
Stenoptilia lutescens 
Stenoptilia pelidnodactyla 
Stenoptilia pneumonanthes 
Stenoptilia pterodactyla 
Stenoptilia stigmatodactylus 
Stenoptilia zophodactylus

Pyralidae
Achroia grisella 
Acrobasis advenella 
Acrobasis consociella 
Acrobasis glaucella 
Acrobasis legatea 
Acrobasis marmorea 
Acrobasis obliqua 
Acrobasis obtusella 
Acrobasis repandana 
Acrobasis sodalella 
Acrobasis suavella 
Acrobasis tumidana 
Aglossa caprealis 
Aglossa pinguinalis 
Ancylosis cinnamomella 
Ancylosis oblitella 
Ancylosis sareptalla 
Anerastia lotella 
Aphomia sociella 
Aphomia zelleri 
Apomyelois ceratoniae 
Asarta aethiopella 
Asarta alpicolella 
Assara terebrella 
Bradyrrhoa cantenerella 
Cadra calidella 
Cadra cautella 
Cadra figulilella 
Catastia marginea 
Corcyra cephalonica 
Cremnophila sedakovella 
Cryptoblabes bistriga 
Delplanqueia dilutella 
Dioryctria abietella 
Dioryctria schuetzeella 
Dioryctria simplicella 
Dioryctria sylvestrella 
Eccopisa effractella 
Elegia similella 
Ematheudes punctella 
Endotricha flammealis 
Ephestia elutella 
Ephestia kuehniella 
Ephestia unicolorella 
Ephestia welseriella 
Epischnia prodromella 
Episcythrastis tetricella 
Etiella zinckenella 
Eurhodope cirrigerella 
Eurhodope rosella 
Euzophera bigella 
Euzophera cinerosella 
Euzophera fuliginosella 
Euzophera pinguis 
Euzopherodes vapidella 
Galleria mellonella 
Glyptoteles leucacrinella 
Gymnancyla canella 
Homoeosoma inustella 
Homoeosoma nebulella 
Homoeosoma nimbella 
Homoeosoma sinuella 
Hypochalcia ahenella 
Hypochalcia lignella 
Hypochalcia propinquella 
Hypsopygia costalis 
Hypsopygia glaucinalis 
Hypsopygia rubidalis 
Isauria dilucidella 
Khorassania compositella 
Lamoria anella 
Laodamia faecella 
Matilella fusca 
Megasis rippertella 
Merulempista cingillella 
Moitrelia obductella 
Myelois circumvoluta 
Nephopterix angustella 
Nyctegretis lineana 
Oncocera semirubella 
Ortholepis betulae 
Paralipsa gularis 
Pempelia genistella 
Pempelia palumbella 
Pempeliella bayassensis 
Pempeliella ornatella 
Pempeliella sororiella 
Phycita coronatella 
Phycita roborella 
Phycitodes albatella 
Phycitodes binaevella 
Phycitodes inquinatella 
Phycitodes maritima 
Phycitodes saxicola 
Pima boisduvaliella 
Plodia interpunctella 
Psorosa dahliella 
Pterothrixidia rufella 
Pyralis farinalis 
Pyralis regalis 
Rhodophaea formosa 
Salebriopsis albicilla 
Sciota adelphella 
Sciota fumella 
Sciota hostilis 
Sciota rhenella 
Selagia argyrella 
Selagia spadicella 
Stemmatophora brunnealis 
Synaphe punctalis 
Trachonitis cristella 
Vitula biviella 
Zophodia grossulariella

Roeslerstammiidae
Roeslerstammia erxlebella 
Roeslerstammia pronubella

Saturniidae
Aglia tau 
Graellsia isabellae 
Samia cynthia 
Saturnia pavonia 
Saturnia pavoniella 
Saturnia pyri

Schreckensteiniidae
Schreckensteinia festaliella

Scythrididae
Enolmis acanthella 
Enolmis delicatella 
Scythris alseriella 
Scythris amphonycella 
Scythris bengtssoni 
Scythris bornicensis 
Scythris crassiuscula 
Scythris cuspidella 
Scythris dissimilella 
Scythris ericetella 
Scythris fallacella 
Scythris flavilaterella 
Scythris fuscoaenea 
Scythris glacialis 
Scythris grandipennis 
Scythris gravatella 
Scythris inspersella 
Scythris knochella 
Scythris laminella 
Scythris limbella 
Scythris noricella 
Scythris obscurella 
Scythris oelandicella 
Scythris palustris 
Scythris picaepennis 
Scythris productella 
Scythris scopolella 
Scythris seliniella 
Scythris speyeri 
Scythris tributella 
Scythris vittella

Sesiidae
Bembecia albanensis 
Bembecia ichneumoniformis 
Bembecia scopigera 
Bembecia uroceriformis 
Chamaesphecia aerifrons 
Chamaesphecia dumonti 
Chamaesphecia empiformis 
Chamaesphecia leucopsiformis 
Paranthrene insolitus 
Paranthrene tabaniformis 
Pennisetia hylaeiformis 
Pyropteron affinis 
Pyropteron chrysidiformis 
Pyropteron muscaeformis 
Pyropteron triannuliformis 
Sesia apiformis 
Sesia bembeciformis 
Sesia melanocephala 
Synanthedon andrenaeformis 
Synanthedon cephiformis 
Synanthedon conopiformis 
Synanthedon culiciformis 
Synanthedon flaviventris 
Synanthedon formicaeformis 
Synanthedon loranthi 
Synanthedon myopaeformis 
Synanthedon polaris 
Synanthedon scoliaeformis 
Synanthedon soffneri 
Synanthedon spheciformis 
Synanthedon spuleri 
Synanthedon stomoxiformis 
Synanthedon tipuliformis 
Synanthedon vespiformis

Sphingidae
Acherontia atropos 
Agrius convolvuli 
Daphnis nerii 
Deilephila elpenor 
Deilephila porcellus 
Hemaris fuciformis 
Hemaris tityus 
Hippotion celerio 
Hyles euphorbiae 
Hyles gallii 
Hyles hippophaes 
Hyles livornica 
Hyles vespertilio 
Laothoe populi 
Macroglossum stellatarum 
Marumba quercus 
Mimas tiliae 
Proserpinus proserpina 
Smerinthus ocellata 
Sphinx ligustri 
Sphinx pinastri

Stathmopodidae
Stathmopoda pedella

Thyrididae
Thyris fenestrella

Tineidae
Agnathosia mendicella 
Archinemapogon yildizae 
Cephimallota crassiflavella 
Dryadaula pactolia 
Elatobia fuliginosella 
Eudarcia pagenstecherella 
Eudarcia confusella 
Euplocamus anthracinalis 
Haplotinea insectella 
Infurcitinea albicomella 
Infurcitinea argentimaculella 
Infurcitinea atrifasciella 
Infurcitinea captans 
Infurcitinea ignicomella 
Infurcitinea roesslerella 
Ischnoscia borreonella 
Lichenotinea pustulatella 
Monopis crocicapitella 
Monopis imella 
Monopis laevigella 
Monopis monachella 
Monopis obviella 
Monopis weaverella 
Montetinea tenuicornella 
Morophaga choragella 
Myrmecozela ochraceella 
Nemapogon clematella 
Nemapogon cloacella 
Nemapogon granella 
Nemapogon nigralbella 
Nemapogon picarella 
Nemapogon ruricolella 
Nemapogon variatella 
Nemapogon wolffiella 
Nemaxera betulinella 
Niditinea fuscella 
Niditinea striolella 
Niditinea truncicolella 
Opogona sacchari 
Stenoptinea cyaneimarmorella 
Tenaga rhenania 
Tinea columbariella 
Tinea dubiella 
Tinea murariella 
Tinea pellionella 
Tinea semifulvella 
Tinea trinotella 
Triaxomasia caprimulgella 
Triaxomera fulvimitrella 
Triaxomera parasitella 
Trichophaga tapetzella

Tischeriidae
Coptotriche angusticollella 
Coptotriche gaunacella 
Coptotriche marginea 
Tischeria decidua 
Tischeria dodonaea 
Tischeria ekebladella

Tortricidae
Acleris abietana 
Acleris aspersana 
Acleris bergmanniana 
Acleris comariana 
Acleris cristana 
Acleris emargana 
Acleris ferrugana 
Acleris forsskaleana 
Acleris hastiana 
Acleris hippophaeana 
Acleris holmiana 
Acleris hyemana 
Acleris kochiella 
Acleris lacordairana 
Acleris laterana 
Acleris lipsiana 
Acleris literana 
Acleris logiana 
Acleris lorquiniana 
Acleris maccana 
Acleris notana 
Acleris quercinana 
Acleris rhombana 
Acleris roscidana 
Acleris rufana 
Acleris scabrana 
Acleris schalleriana 
Acleris shepherdana 
Acleris sparsana 
Acleris umbrana 
Acleris variegana 
Adoxophyes orana 
Aethes ardezana 
Aethes aurofasciana 
Aethes bilbaensis 
Aethes cnicana 
Aethes decimana 
Aethes deutschiana 
Aethes dilucidana 
Aethes flagellana 
Aethes francillana 
Aethes hartmanniana 
Aethes kindermanniana 
Aethes margaritana 
Aethes piercei 
Aethes rutilana 
Aethes sanguinana 
Aethes smeathmanniana 
Aethes tesserana 
Aethes williana 
Agapeta hamana 
Agapeta zoegana 
Aleimma loeflingiana 
Ancylis achatana 
Ancylis apicella 
Ancylis badiana 
Ancylis comptana 
Ancylis diminutana 
Ancylis geminana 
Ancylis laetana 
Ancylis mitterbacheriana 
Ancylis myrtillana 
Ancylis obtusana 
Ancylis rhenana 
Ancylis selenana 
Ancylis tineana 
Ancylis uncella 
Ancylis unculana 
Ancylis unguicella 
Ancylis upupana 
Aphelia viburniana 
Aphelia ferugana 
Aphelia paleana 
Aphelia unitana 
Apotomis betuletana 
Apotomis capreana 
Apotomis infida 
Apotomis inundana 
Apotomis lineana 
Apotomis sauciana 
Apotomis semifasciana 
Apotomis sororculana 
Apotomis turbidana 
Archips crataegana 
Archips oporana 
Archips podana 
Archips rosana 
Archips xylosteana 
Argyroploce arbutella 
Argyroploce noricana 
Argyroploce roseomaculana 
Argyrotaenia ljungiana 
Aterpia anderreggana 
Aterpia corticana 
Bactra furfurana 
Bactra lacteana 
Bactra lancealana 
Bactra venosana 
Cacoecimorpha pronubana 
Capua vulgana 
Celypha aurofasciana 
Celypha cespitana 
Celypha doubledayana 
Celypha flavipalpana 
Celypha lacunana 
Celypha rivulana 
Celypha rosaceana 
Celypha rufana 
Celypha rurestrana 
Celypha siderana 
Celypha striana 
Celypha woodiana 
Choristoneura diversana 
Choristoneura hebenstreitella 
Choristoneura lafauryana 
Choristoneura murinana 
Clavigesta purdeyi 
Clavigesta sylvestrana 
Clepsis consimilana 
Clepsis dumicolana 
Clepsis neglectana 
Clepsis pallidana 
Clepsis rogana 
Clepsis rurinana 
Clepsis senecionana 
Clepsis spectrana 
Clepsis steineriana 
Clepsis unicolorana 
Cnephasia alticolana 
Cnephasia asseclana 
Cnephasia communana 
Cnephasia cupressivorana 
Cnephasia ecullyana 
Cnephasia genitalana 
Cnephasia heinemanni 
Cnephasia longana 
Cnephasia pasiuana 
Cnephasia sedana 
Cnephasia stephensiana 
Cnephasia incertana 
Cochylidia heydeniana 
Cochylidia implicitana 
Cochylidia richteriana 
Cochylidia rupicola 
Cochylidia subroseana 
Cochylimorpha alternana 
Cochylimorpha hilarana 
Cochylimorpha jucundana 
Cochylimorpha meridiana 
Cochylimorpha perfusana 
Cochylimorpha straminea 
Cochylimorpha tiraculana 
Cochylimorpha woliniana 
Cochylis atricapitana 
Cochylis dubitana 
Cochylis epilinana 
Cochylis flaviciliana 
Cochylis hybridella 
Cochylis nana 
Cochylis pallidana 
Cochylis posterana 
Cochylis roseana 
Commophila aeneana 
Corticivora piniana 
Crocidosema plebejana 
Cydia adenocarpi 
Cydia albipicta 
Cydia amplana 
Cydia cognatana 
Cydia conicolana 
Cydia coniferana 
Cydia corollana 
Cydia cosmophorana 
Cydia cythisanthana 
Cydia duplicana 
Cydia exquisitana 
Cydia fagiglandana 
Cydia grunertiana 
Cydia illutana 
Cydia indivisa 
Cydia interscindana 
Cydia intexta 
Cydia leguminana 
Cydia medicaginis 
Cydia microgrammana 
Cydia millenniana 
Cydia nigricana 
Cydia oxytropidis 
Cydia pactolana 
Cydia pomonella 
Cydia semicinctana 
Cydia servillana 
Cydia splendana 
Cydia strobilella 
Cydia succedana 
Cydia vallesiaca 
Cydia zebeana 
Cymolomia hartigiana 
Diceratura ostrinana 
Dichelia histrionana 
Dichrorampha acuminatana 
Dichrorampha aeratana 
Dichrorampha agilana 
Dichrorampha alpigenana 
Dichrorampha alpinana 
Dichrorampha bugnionana 
Dichrorampha cacaleana 
Dichrorampha chavanneana 
Dichrorampha consortana 
Dichrorampha distinctana 
Dichrorampha flavidorsana 
Dichrorampha gruneriana 
Dichrorampha harpeana 
Dichrorampha incognitana 
Dichrorampha incursana 
Dichrorampha ligulana 
Dichrorampha montanana 
Dichrorampha petiverella 
Dichrorampha plumbagana 
Dichrorampha plumbana 
Dichrorampha sedatana 
Dichrorampha senectana 
Dichrorampha sequana 
Dichrorampha simpliciana 
Dichrorampha sylvicolana 
Dichrorampha thomanni 
Dichrorampha vancouverana 
Ditula angustiorana 
Doloploca punctulana 
Eana cottiana 
Eana derivana 
Eana freii 
Eana incanana 
Eana incognitana 
Eana nervana 
Eana penziana 
Eana viardi 
Eana argentana 
Eana osseana 
Eana canescana 
Enarmonia formosana 
Endothenia ericetana 
Endothenia gentianaeana 
Endothenia lapideana 
Endothenia marginana 
Endothenia nigricostana 
Endothenia pauperculana 
Endothenia quadrimaculana 
Endothenia ustulana 
Epagoge grotiana 
Epiblema costipunctana 
Epiblema foenella 
Epiblema grandaevana 
Epiblema graphana 
Epiblema hepaticana 
Epiblema inulivora 
Epiblema mendiculana 
Epiblema sarmatana 
Epiblema scutulana 
Epiblema similana 
Epiblema simploniana 
Epiblema sticticana 
Epichoristodes acerbella 
Epinotia abbreviana 
Epinotia bilunana 
Epinotia brunnichana 
Epinotia crenana 
Epinotia cruciana 
Epinotia demarniana 
Epinotia festivana 
Epinotia fraternana 
Epinotia granitana 
Epinotia immundana 
Epinotia maculana 
Epinotia mercuriana 
Epinotia nanana 
Epinotia nemorivaga 
Epinotia nigricana 
Epinotia nisella 
Epinotia pusillana 
Epinotia pygmaeana 
Epinotia ramella 
Epinotia rubiginosana 
Epinotia signatana 
Epinotia solandriana 
Epinotia sordidana 
Epinotia subocellana 
Epinotia subsequana 
Epinotia subuculana 
Epinotia tedella 
Epinotia tenerana 
Epinotia tetraquetrana 
Epinotia thapsiana 
Epinotia trigonella 
Eriopsela quadrana 
Eucosma aemulana 
Eucosma albidulana 
Eucosma aspidiscana 
Eucosma balatonana 
Eucosma campoliliana 
Eucosma cana 
Eucosma conterminana 
Eucosma culmana 
Eucosma hohenwartiana 
Eucosma metzneriana 
Eucosma mirificana 
Eucosma monstratana 
Eucosma obumbratana 
Eucosma parvulana 
Eucosma pupillana 
Eucosma tripoliana 
Eucosma wimmerana 
Eucosmomorpha albersana 
Eudemis porphyrana 
Eudemis profundana 
Eugnosta parreyssiana 
Eulia ministrana 
Eupoecilia ambiguella 
Eupoecilia angustana 
Eupoecilia sanguisorbana 
Exapate congelatella 
Exapate duratella 
Falseuncaria degreyana 
Falseuncaria ruficiliana 
Gibberifera simplana 
Grapholita andabatana 
Grapholita funebrana 
Grapholita janthinana 
Grapholita lobarzewskii 
Grapholita molesta 
Grapholita tenebrosana 
Grapholita aureolana 
Grapholita caecana 
Grapholita compositella 
Grapholita coronillana 
Grapholita discretana 
Grapholita fissana 
Grapholita gemmiferana 
Grapholita jungiella 
Grapholita lathyrana 
Grapholita lunulana 
Grapholita nebritana 
Grapholita orobana 
Grapholita pallifrontana 
Gravitarmata margarotana 
Gynnidomorpha permixtana 
Gypsonoma aceriana 
Gypsonoma dealbana 
Gypsonoma imparana 
Gypsonoma minutana 
Gypsonoma nitidulana 
Gypsonoma oppressana 
Gypsonoma sociana 
Hedya nubiferana 
Hedya ochroleucana 
Hedya pruniana 
Hedya salicella 
Isotrias rectifasciana 
Isotrias stramentana 
Lathronympha strigana 
Lepteucosma huebneriana 
Lobesia andereggiana 
Lobesia artemisiana 
Lobesia bicinctana 
Lobesia botrana 
Lobesia littoralis 
Lobesia reliquana 
Lozotaenia forsterana 
Lozotaeniodes formosana 
Metendothenia atropunctana 
Neosphaleroptera nubilana 
Notocelia cynosbatella 
Notocelia incarnatana 
Notocelia roborana 
Notocelia rosaecolana 
Notocelia tetragonana 
Notocelia trimaculana 
Notocelia uddmanniana 
Olethreutes arcuella 
Olindia schumacherana 
Orthotaenia undulana 
Pammene agnotana 
Pammene albuginana 
Pammene amygdalana 
Pammene argyrana 
Pammene aurana 
Pammene aurita 
Pammene fasciana 
Pammene gallicana 
Pammene germmana 
Pammene giganteana 
Pammene ignorata 
Pammene insulana 
Pammene juniperana 
Pammene obscurana 
Pammene ochsenheimeriana 
Pammene populana 
Pammene purpureana 
Pammene regiana 
Pammene rhediella 
Pammene spiniana 
Pammene splendidulana 
Pammene suspectana 
Pammene trauniana 
Pandemis cerasana 
Pandemis cinnamomeana 
Pandemis corylana 
Pandemis dumetana 
Pandemis heparana 
Paramesia gnomana 
Pelochrista caecimaculana 
Pelochrista infidana 
Pelochrista modicana 
Pelochrista mollitana 
Periclepsis cinctana 
Phalonidia curvistrigana 
Phalonidia gilvicomana 
Phalonidia manniana 
Phaneta pauperana 
Phiaris astrana 
Phiaris bipunctana 
Phiaris dissolutana 
Phiaris helveticana 
Phiaris metallicana 
Phiaris micana 
Phiaris obsoletana 
Phiaris palustrana 
Phiaris schulziana 
Phiaris scoriana 
Phiaris septentrionana 
Phiaris turfosana 
Phiaris umbrosana 
Phiaris valesiana 
Philedone gerningana 
Philedonides lunana 
Phtheochroa inopiana 
Phtheochroa rugosana 
Phtheochroa schreibersiana 
Phtheochroa sodaliana 
Phtheochroa vulneratana 
Piniphila bifasciana 
Pristerognatha fuligana 
Pristerognatha penthinana 
Pseudargyrotoza conwagana 
Pseudococcyx mughiana 
Pseudococcyx posticana 
Pseudococcyx tessulatana 
Pseudococcyx turionella 
Pseudohermenias abietana 
Pseudosciaphila branderiana 
Ptycholoma lecheana 
Ptycholomoides aeriferana 
Retinia perangustana 
Retinia resinella 
Rhopobota myrtillana 
Rhopobota naevana 
Rhopobota stagnana 
Rhopobota ustomaculana 
Rhyacionia buoliana 
Rhyacionia duplana 
Rhyacionia pinicolana 
Rhyacionia pinivorana 
Selenodes karelica 
Sparganothis pilleriana 
Spatalistis bifasciana 
Sphaleroptera alpicolana 
Spilonota laricana 
Spilonota ocellana 
Stictea mygindiana 
Strophedra nitidana 
Strophedra weirana 
Syndemis musculana 
Thiodia citrana 
Thiodia couleruana 
Thiodia torridana 
Thiodia trochilana 
Tortricodes alternella 
Tortrix viridana 
Xerocnephasia rigana 
Zeiraphera griseana 
Zeiraphera isertana 
Zeiraphera ratzeburgiana 
Zeiraphera rufimitrana

Yponomeutidae
Cedestis gysseleniella 
Cedestis subfasciella 
Euhyponomeuta stannella 
Euhyponomeutoides albithoracellus 
Kessleria fasciapennella 
Kessleria saxifragae 
Kessleria alpicella 
Kessleria alternans 
Kessleria burmanni 
Kessleria caflischiella 
Kessleria helvetica 
Niphonympha dealbatella 
Ocnerostoma friesei 
Ocnerostoma piniariella 
Parahyponomeuta egregiella 
Paraswammerdamia albicapitella 
Paraswammerdamia conspersella 
Paraswammerdamia nebulella 
Pseudoswammerdamia combinella 
Scythropia crataegella 
Swammerdamia caesiella 
Swammerdamia compunctella 
Swammerdamia pyrella 
Yponomeuta cagnagella 
Yponomeuta evonymella 
Yponomeuta irrorella 
Yponomeuta malinellus 
Yponomeuta padella 
Yponomeuta plumbella 
Yponomeuta rorrella 
Yponomeuta sedella 
Zelleria hepariella

Ypsolophidae
Ochsenheimeria glabratella 
Ochsenheimeria taurella 
Ochsenheimeria urella 
Ochsenheimeria vacculella 
Phrealcia eximiella 
Ypsolopha alpella 
Ypsolopha asperella 
Ypsolopha coriacella 
Ypsolopha dentella 
Ypsolopha falcella 
Ypsolopha horridella 
Ypsolopha instabilella 
Ypsolopha lucella 
Ypsolopha mucronella 
Ypsolopha nemorella 
Ypsolopha parenthesella 
Ypsolopha persicella 
Ypsolopha scabrella 
Ypsolopha sequella 
Ypsolopha sylvella 
Ypsolopha ustella 
Ypsolopha vittella

Zygaenidae
Adscita albanica 
Adscita alpina 
Adscita geryon 
Adscita statices 
Adscita mannii 
Aglaope infausta 
Jordanita chloros 
Jordanita globulariae 
Jordanita subsolana 
Jordanita notata 
Rhagades pruni 
Zygaena carniolica 
Zygaena fausta 
Zygaena minos 
Zygaena purpuralis 
Zygaena ephialtes 
Zygaena exulans 
Zygaena filipendulae 
Zygaena lonicerae 
Zygaena loti 
Zygaena osterodensis 
Zygaena romeo 
Zygaena transalpina 
Zygaena trifolii 
Zygaena viciae

References

External links
Fauna Europaea

Switzerland
Switzerland
Moths
Lepidoptera